Lincoln Municipal Airport may refer to:

 Lincoln Municipal Airport (Kansas) in Lincoln, Kansas, United States (FAA: K71)
 Lincoln Municipal Airport (Missouri) in Lincoln, Missouri, United States (FAA: 0R2)
 Lincoln Airport (Nebraska), formerly Lincoln Municipal Airport, in Lincoln, Nebraska, United States (FAA: LNK)

See also
 Lincoln Airport (disambiguation)
 Lincoln County Airport (disambiguation)
 Lincoln Regional Airport (disambiguation)